Eemil Vihtori Luukka (1 December 1892, Muolaa – 1 June 1970, Valkeakoski) was a Finnish politician from the Agrarian League and most remembered as an advocate of Karjalan Liitto. 

Luukka was a member of the parliament from 1936 to 1966 and held ministerial post in eight cabinets between 1942 and 1962. He served as a deputy of Prime Minister V. J. Sukselainen from 3 July to 14 July 1961 and a deputy of Martti Miettunen from 14 July 1961 to 12 April 1962. 

Luukka was an advocate of the peaceful return of Karelia and was the chairman of Karjalan Liitto 1946–1967.

References 

1892 births
1970 deaths
People from Vyborg District
People from Viipuri Province (Grand Duchy of Finland)
Centre Party (Finland) politicians
Deputy Prime Ministers of Finland
Ministers of Agriculture of Finland
Ministers of the Interior of Finland
Members of the Parliament of Finland (1936–39)
Members of the Parliament of Finland (1939–45)
Members of the Parliament of Finland (1945–48)
Members of the Parliament of Finland (1948–51)
Members of the Parliament of Finland (1951–54)
Members of the Parliament of Finland (1954–58)
Members of the Parliament of Finland (1958–62)
Members of the Parliament of Finland (1962–66) 
Finnish people of World War II